This is a list of the rivers of Serbia, either those flowing entirely or partially within Serbia proper, or just being a border rivers.

Drainage basins 

All rivers in Serbia belong to the drainage basins of three seas: Black Sea, Adriatic Sea or Aegean Sea.

The largest in area, Black Sea drainage basin, covers an area of 81,261 km2 or 92% of the territory of Serbia. The entire basin is drained by only one river, the Danube, which flows into the Black Sea. All major rivers in Serbia, like Tisa, Sava, Velika Morava and Drina belong to it.

The Adriatic Sea drainage basin covers an area of 4,500 km2 or 5% of territory of Serbia. It comprises the western half of the Kosovo and Metohija and it is mostly drained by one river, the White Drin, which in Albania meets the Black Drin to create the Drin river, which flows into the Adriatic Sea. Smaller portion of it is drained by Crni Kamen-Radika river in the extreme southern region of Gora, which also drains into Black Drin in North Macedonia.

The Aegean Sea basin is the smallest in area, 2,650 km2 or 3% of the territory of Serbia, and covers the southern parts of Serbia, to the Macedonian and Bulgarian borders. It is drained by three rivers: Lepenac, Pčinja and Dragovištica. The first two flow into the Vardar river in North Macedonia, and the third flows into the Struma river in Bulgaria, and both of those rivers flow into the Aegean Sea.

All three basins meet at the Drmanska glava peak on the Crnoljeva mountain in central Kosovo, which represents the water divide of Serbia and the major one in the Balkans, as it divides three out of the Balkan's four drainage basins (the fourth being the Ionian Sea).

List of major rivers 

The lengths in the table present the overall lengths of the rivers, not just the Serbian parts of the flow. In the first table, rivers over 50 km are listed, including river systems (such as Great Morava) created by confluence of other major rivers; in those cases, the length is given as the total of the river and the longer headstream.

Selected list of shorter rivers is added below the two tables.

Major sub-rivers 
Some rivers, historically with different names, are already included in the length of other rivers, but exist as separate rivers in topography or tradition. The most prominent ones are listed below.

List of selected rivers below 50 km

See also 
List of mountains in Serbia
List of lakes in Serbia

Serbia
Rivers